INEOS Styrolution is a global styrenics supplier and is headquartered in Germany. It is a subcompany of INEOS and provides styrenics applications for many everyday products across a broad range of industries, including automotive, electronics, household, construction, healthcare, packaging and toys/sports/leisure.

Headquarters and sites 
Styrolution employs around 3,100 people. The global and European headquarters is situated in Frankfurt am Main, Germany, regional headquarters are located in Aurora, Illinois (United States) and Singapore. Styrolution operates 16 manufacturing sites across nine countries: Germany (Ludwigshafen, Schwarzheide, Cologne), Belgium (Antwerp), China (Foshan, Ningbo), France (Wingles), Korea (Ulsan, Yeosu), Thailand (Map Ta Phut), the United States (Channahon, Decatur, Texas City, Bayport), Canada (Sarnia) and Mexico (Altamira).

Product portfolio 
Styrolution offers various styrenics commodity and specialty product types, i.e. styrene monomer (SM), polystyrene (PS), acrylonitrile butadiene styrene (ABS), styrene-butadiene block copolymers (SBC), other styrene-based copolymers (SAN, AMSAN, ASA, MABS), and copolymer blends.
Styrenics are thermoplastics.

Styrene monomer (SM) is an intermediate product. It is a colorless liquid that polymerizes easily.

Polystyrene (PS) is a thermoplastic resin that is used in many applications, such as disposable packaging, electronic devices, large appliances (for example in refrigeration liners) and household goods.

Acrylonitrile butadiene styrene (ABS) is a thermoplastic resin, used primarily in colored products that need to be heat and impact-resistant, such as vacuum cleaners or power tools. It is also commonly found in vehicles, mobile phone housings and recreational goods.

Styrene-butadiene block copolymer (SBC) is a thermoplastic resin that is transparent and impact-resistant. It is used to provide a high optical appearance and is mostly found in food and display packaging.

Styrene-based copolymers (SAN, AMSAN, ASA, MABS) and blends (ABS/PA, ASA/PA, ASA/PC) are thermoplastic resins that are mainly used in various technical applications, such as vehicles, garden equipment, tools, appliances, consumer electronics, communications devices and computers.

Corporate history 
Styrolution was founded in October 2011 as a 50-50 joint venture between BASF and INEOS. It has more than 85 years of experience in the styrenics industry.

April 8, 2011: The formation of the joint venture is approved by the U.S. Federal Trade Commission (FTC) without any remedies.

May 12, 2011: Styrolution places a 480 million Euro bond due 2016 on the capital market.

May 27, 2011: BASF and INEOS sign a joint venture contract, which regulates the formation of the joint venture company Styrolution.

June 1, 2011: The EU Commission approves the formation of the joint venture Styrolution. It gives its approval subject to the requirement that the parties sell an ABS production site in Tarragona, Spain. This site accounted for less than 3% of Styrolution’s pro forma EBITDA before exceptionals for the year 2010.

October 1, 2011: Styrolution officially starts operating as an independent company, following the approval of the relevant antitrust authorities.

November 30, 2011: BASF and INEOS sign a letter of intent for a joint venture combining their key styrenics assets.

June 30, 2014: Joint statement that INEOS takes over the 50% stake of BASF SE for a purchase price of €1.1bn.

November 17, 2014: Styrolution becomes wholly owned by INEOS.

January 18, 2016: To embrace its place in the INEOS family of companies, Styrolution announces that it has changed its company name to INEOS Styrolution.

February 1, 2022: It was announced that INEOS Styrolution had concluded a joint agreement for Ensinger to acquire its StyLight thermoplastic composite materials business.

See also
Novodur

References

External links 
 Chemanager-online.com: Dedicated to Styrenics, October 14, 2011
 ICIS.com: EPCA '11: Styrolution to be a global leader in SM, PS, October 4, 2011
 INEOS Styrolution website
 INEOS website

Chemical companies of Germany
Manufacturing companies based in Frankfurt